Hayden Inacio, known professionally as Bankrol Hayden, is an American rapper from Modesto, California. Signed to Atlantic Records, he is known for his gold-certified singles "Brothers" featuring Luh Kel and "Costa Rica", and his album Pain is Temporary, with the latter peaking at number 197 on the Billboard 200.

Early life and inspiration 
Bankrol Hayden was born as Hayden Inacio in Modesto, California. He began rapping when he was in eighth grade. Hayden cited Kid Cudi as his biggest musical inspiration since childhood.

Career 
In 2017, Hayden released his debut single "Humble" via streaming services and later gained traction with the release of his song "Ride With You". In May 2018, Hayden released his single "29", after being in a serious car accident on November 29, 2017, that spent him six days on life support. In 2019, he released the single "B.A.N.K.R.O.L.". Also in 2019, the single "Brothers" featuring singer and rapper Luh Kel was released. In March 2020, Hayden released the single "Costa Rica", which garnered over 50 million streams and included a remix featuring Australian rapper and singer the Kid Laroi. On June 20, 2020, Hayden released his debut album Pain is Temporary with appearances from Lil Baby, Polo G, and the Kid Laroi. The album peaked at number 197 on the Billboard 200. In March 2021, Hayden was featured on crooner LB Spiffy's single "Again". In September 2021, Hayden released the single "Come Through" featuring rapper Lil Tecca. On March 10, 2023, Hayden released his second album 29 with appearances from Blueface, Lil Tecca and Charlieonnafriday.

Discography

Studio albums

Singles

As lead artist

As featured artist

References

External links
 Official website

21st-century American male musicians
21st-century American rappers
American hip hop singers
American male rappers
American male songwriters
Atlantic Records artists
Living people
People from Modesto, California
Rappers from California
Songwriters from California
Trap musicians
Year of birth missing (living people)